Nadejda Mikhailovna Mountbatten, Marchioness of Milford Haven (née Countess Nadejda Mikhailovna de Torby, until 1917 Princess George of Battenberg; 28 March 1896 – 22 January 1963), was a member of the Russian imperial family who married a German prince but became a British subject and aristocrat. She was a close relation of the British royal family.

Life
Countess Nadejda de Torby was the second daughter of Grand Duke Michael Mikhailovich of Russia and his morganatic wife Countess Sophie of Merenberg. She was a younger sister of Countess Anastasia de Torby.

Her paternal grandparents were Grand Duke Michael Nicolaievich of Russia and Princess Cecily of Baden. Michael was the seventh and last child of Nicholas I of Russia and Charlotte of Prussia. Her mother was daughter of Prince Nikolaus Wilhelm of Nassau and his morganatic wife Natalia Pushkina, Countess of Merenberg, daughter of Aleksandr Pushkin, who in turn was a great-grandson of Peter the Great's African protégé, Abram Petrovich Gannibal.

Nicknamed "Nada", she married Prince George of Battenberg, later the 2nd Marquess of Milford Haven, in London, England, on 15 November 1916. They had two children: Lady Tatiana Elizabeth Mountbatten (16 December 1917 – 15 May 1988), who died unmarried, and David Michael Mountbatten, 3rd Marquess of Milford Haven (12 May 1919 – 14 April 1970), father of the present Marquess.

During the 1934 Gloria Vanderbilt custody trial, a former maid of Gloria Morgan Vanderbilt's offered testimony regarding a possible lesbian relationship between Lady Milford Haven and her former employer. Lady Milford Haven also appeared as a witness at the trial. Before leaving for the United States to testify, Lady Milford Haven publicly denounced the maid's testimony as "a set of malicious, terrible lies". However, in June 2022 her grandson Lord Ivar Mounbatten stated in an interview with The Tatler that she was a lesbian. So far there is no personal account of Nadedja, that is publicly published, that indicates that she may or may not was a lesbian.

Nada and her sister-in-law, Edwina Mountbatten (wife of Lord Mountbatten), were extremely close friends and the two frequently went together on rather daring adventures, travelling rough in difficult and often dangerous parts of the world.

Lady Milford Haven died in Cannes, France, in 1963.

Ancestry

See also
 Morganatic branches of the Russian Imperial Family

References

1896 births
1963 deaths
19th-century people from the Russian Empire
19th-century women from the Russian Empire
Nadejda
British marchionesses
German princesses
Countesses of the Russian Empire
Princesses by marriage
Morganatic issue of Romanovs
Emigrants from the Russian Empire to France